Irsa Ghazal is a Pakistani television actor known for her roles in television serials such as Miraat-ul-Uroos, Ullu Baraye Farokht Nahi, Aangan, O Rangreza and Ishq Jalebi.

Biography and career
Ghazal is the daughter of former actress, Ismat Tahira. Her sister Ushna Shah is also an actress. Ghazal married to Sajid Shah in April 2021, who is also an actor.

She made her acting debut from PTV's Miraat-ul-Uroos in mid-1990s. Then, she appeared in television serials such as Samjhauta Express, Ullu Baraye Farokht Nahi and Kahi Unkahi, the second one of which earned her nomination of Lux Style Award for Best TV Actress. She further appeared in television serials such as O Rangreza, Aangan, Ruswai and Ishq Jalebi.

Filmography

Television

References 

Year of birth missing (living people)
Living people
Pakistani television actresses
21st-century Pakistani actresses